Jighi (also Romanized as Jīghī; also known as Jaghi and Jīqī) is a village in Sardaran Rural District, in the Central District of Kabudarahang County, Hamadan Province, Iran. At the 2006 census, its population was 505, in 122 families.

References 

Populated places in Kabudarahang County